Pacific Records is a San Diego, California based music label founded in 2003 as an independent record label and music publisher. Amongst the labels releases are albums by O-Town, Slack Key Ohana and the Guitar Legends television special soundtracks. Helmed by CEO Brian Witkin, a San Diego-based entertainment attorney, the seeds of Pacific Records were planted in 1999, with the opening of Real2Reel Records, at first in his parent's home before relocating in November 2004 to a shop located inside all-ages music venue "The Epicentre" in San Diego's Mira Mesa neighborhood. The shop initially began releasing music under the Real2Reel name, but soon changed to Pacific Records. While the shop closed in June 2007, Pacific Records continued as a label. Witkin signed both local and national talent from the beginning, including San Diego's Get Back Loretta and Virginia based, Life's Only Lesson. A short time after, the imprint was acquired by Wingnut Media Group, Inc, based in Del Mar, California, soon transferred to Georgi Entertainment, LLC. In 2009 Witkin purchased the company back under the holding company New Pacific Group, currently, Pacific Records, Inc. The label includes in house recording studios, engineering marketing and distribution.

2010 – 2015
In 2014 Pacific Records began booking the VIP Lounge at the then Valley View Casino Center, showcasing their talent roster prior to the mainstage headliners. The arrangement has continued through the venue's name change to Pechanga Arena.
In 2015 Pacific Records produced and released the “San Diego Gulls Anthem,” the official song of the San Diego-based hockey team, San Diego Gulls.

2016 -2019
In 2017, the label released its first soundtrack, for the film 9/11, starring Charlie Sheen. That same year, Pacific Records released the final recording from Motorhead frontman, Lemmy Kilmister, with Chris Declercq, “We Are the Ones.” 
In August 2019 the label released The O.T.W.N Album from a reunited O-Town, with the band performing lead track, “Off”, on CBS-TV's The Late Late Show with James Corden
Meanwhile, in November 2019 the label hosted a showcase stage aboard the Marrietta Ferry at the inaugural Wonderfront Music and Arts Festival in San Diego. Pacific Records also released the soundtrack to the live television special, Guitar Legends III, recorded at the same Wonderfront Festival, featuring Billy Gibbons, Warren Haynes, Nancy Wilson, George Thorogood and Steve Lukather.

2020-2022
In October 2020, the label released the debut album from the Original Starfires, featuring latter day, New Mamas and Papas singer Laurie Beebe Lewis and singer Eli Holland, as well as a collaborative single, “Bad Wolves” featuring Rebecca Jade, Grammy winner Jason Mraz, Miki Vale and Veronica May. The song takes a stand against racism, with a video shot at the House of Pacific Relations International Cottages, located in San Diego's Balboa Park, ultimately winning “Song of The Year” at the 2021 San Diego Music Awards (SDMA). That same year Pacific Records signed reggae artist Skyler Lutes also took home an award for “Best Local Recording.”  Meanwhile, in 2021 Pacific Records reissued the album Grapefruit Moon by Southside Johnny with LaBamba's Big Band. Also in 2021 label CEO Brian Witkin and musician Kamaka Mullen released a self-titled EP with their Hawaiian themed combo, Slack Key Ohana, winning the “Best World Music Album” category at the 2022 San Diego Music Awards. In 2022 Pacific Records announced a new version of “Don’t Fear The Reaper,” originally by Blue Oyster Cult, as the first in a series of singles produced by Sppike Mike Muellenberg, under the Music's Future banner, as a fundraiser for the San Diego Music Foundation. The collaborative effort includes Mike Watt (Firehose (band)/ The Stooges), Mike Reiter (27 Various / The Dig), Doug Walker (The Dwarves / The Spice Pistols), Bart Mendoza (Manual Scan/ The Shambles (band)), Anna Zinova (Pinkeye), Nick Aguilar (Slaughterhouse), Robbie Allen and Will Lerner (Shake Before Us / Strawberry Moons), with studio production by Jeff Berkley. Since its inception Pacific Records has released music across genres, including pop group O-Town, rockers Sprung Monkey, singer Rebecca Jade and classical guitarist Lito Romero. Recent signings include Emmanuel Kelly, whose single “Red Love” was Executive produced by Coldplay’s Chris Martin, Falling Doves, Kubota, Sandollar, Bart Mendoza, The Josh Rosenblum Band, The Spice Pistols, Jonny Tarr and Chandler Bay.

Partial discography

Albums
2022 Spice Train The Spice Pistols
2022 A Pacific Records Christmas Various Artists
2022 Live at Tiki Oasis Slack Key 'Ohana
2022 Surfidia The Tourmaliners
2022 Green Eyed The Josh Rosenblum Band
2020 Rewind Skyler Lutes
2020 Tough Stuff Jonny Tarr
2019  America Salutes You Presents: Guitar Legends III Various Artists
2019  The O.T.O.W.N Album O-Town
2019  America Salutes You Presents: Guitar Legends II Various Artists
2017  Big Medicine Ryan Hiller
2016  Pages of Life Rebecca Jade
2015  L.O.V.E. Lindsey Perry
2013 Dead Is Dead Sprung Monkey
2013 Roller Coaster Ride Sandollar
2013 Gamma Rays Social Club
2005  Doo Wop and Motown Show Band The Corvettes

EP’s
2021  s/t Slack Key 'Ohana
2021  66/68 Bart Mendoza
2020  Fly Me Away The Original Starfires
2020  s/t The Wildflowers
2020  The Coming Home EP Cambrian Shores
2017  The Dark Revival Lindsey Perry
2014  s/t Lito Romero

Singles
 2021 Red Love Emmanuel Kelly featuring Charli Taft 
 2020 Be My Lover Falling Doves
 2020 Party People Sandollar
 2020 Bad Wolves Rebecca Jade featuring Jason Mraz, Miki Vale & Veronica May
 2019 Something For You Cambrian Shores
 2017 We Are The Ones Chris Declercq featuring Lemmy Kilmister

References

Record labels established in 2003
American independent record labels
Record labels based in California